A rogue black hole (also termed a free-floating, interstellar, nomad, orphan, unbound or wandering black hole) is an interstellar object without a host galactic group. They are caused by collisions between two galaxies or when the merging of two black holes is disrupted. It has been estimated that there could be 12 rogue black holes in the Milky Way galaxy.

OGLE-2011-BLG-0462/MOA-2011-BLG-191 
In January 2022, a team of astronomers reported of OGLE-2011-BLG-0462 the first unambiguous detection and mass measurement of an isolated stellar black hole using the Hubble Space Telescope together with the Microlensing Observations in Astrophysics (MOA) and the Optical Gravitational Lensing Experiment (OGLE). This black hole is located 5,000 light-years away, has a mass 7.1 times that of the Sun, and moves at about 45 km/s. While there have been other candidates, they have been detected more indirectly.

See also 
Rogue planet
Black hole
Stellar black hole

References 

Black holes